Klaus Kirchbaumer (born 7 October 1944) is an Austrian ice hockey player. He competed in the men's tournament at the 1968 Winter Olympics. He also played several years for Innsbrucker EV of the Austrian Hockey League.

References

External links
 

1944 births
Living people
Ice hockey players at the 1968 Winter Olympics
Innsbrucker EV players
Olympic ice hockey players of Austria
Sportspeople from Innsbruck